The New York City Subway is a heavy-rail public transit system serving four of the five boroughs of New York City. The present New York City Subway system inherited the systems of the Interborough Rapid Transit Company (IRT), Brooklyn–Manhattan Transit Corporation (BMT), and the Independent Subway System (IND). New York City has owned the IND since its inception; the BMT and IRT were taken over by the city in 1940. The former IRT system is now known as the A Division, while the B Division is the combined former BMT and IND systems.

In the New York City Subway nomenclature, a "line" refers to the physical trackage used by trains that are used by numbered or lettered "services". Today, the division or company names are not used publicly, while the line names may occasionally be used. The services that run on certain lines change periodically, but the lines refer to static trackage.

Nomenclature

In the nomenclature of the subway, the terms "line" and "service" are not interchangeable with each other. While in popular usage the word "line" is often used synonymously with "service" (even sometimes on the website of the MTA), this list will use the formal usage of the term "line."

A line is the physical structure and tracks that trains run over. Each section of the system is assigned a unique line name that begins with its original division (IRT, BMT or IND). For example, the line under Eighth Avenue is the IND Eighth Avenue Line. Some lines have changed names (and even divisions), but this happens relatively infrequently.

By contrast, a service refers to the route that a train takes across the various lines. A service can operate along several lines and even along different divisions. For example, the  service operates along the IND Queens Boulevard Line as well as the BMT Broadway Line and the BMT Fourth Avenue Line.

Each service is assigned a color. Since 1979, each service's color corresponds to the line it primarily uses in Midtown Manhattan—defined as the trunk line. There are three exceptions: the IND Crosstown Line, which does not carry services to Manhattan, is colored ; the BMT Nassau Street Line, which runs only through Lower Manhattan, is colored ; and all shuttles are colored . The list of trunk lines and colors is shown in the table below.

Line listing 

There are currently  rail lines. The Archer Avenue Lines and the 63rd Street Lines are each classified as two separate lines due to their structure: both lines are able to serve two divisions (the BMT and the IND) on distinct sections of track.

In the list below, lines with colors next to them indicate trunk lines, which determine the colors that are used for services' route bullets and diamonds, as well as shuttle service lines. The opening date refers to the opening of the first section of track for the line. In the "division" column, the current division is followed by the original division in parentheses.

Inter-division connections
The following list shows the connections between the different divisions of the New York City Subway.

Purpose-built

These connections can be used by trains in revenue service:
60th Street Tunnel Connection, also known as the 11th Street Cut (Queens) (BMT/IND) ( train)
63rd Street Lines (Manhattan) (BMT/IND)
Coney Island–Stillwell Avenue station (BMT/IND) (originally all BMT) ( trains)
Chrystie Street Connection (Manhattan) (BMT/IND) via the Manhattan Bridge ( trains) and via the Williamsburg Bridge ( train)

This connection is not for revenue service due to the differing widths of the trains:
Astoria Line / Flushing Line (Queens) (BMT/IRT)

Yards

These connections are located within the subway's rail yards and are not intended for revenue service.
207th Street Yard (Manhattan) (IND/IRT); trains from the IND Eighth Avenue Line and IRT Broadway–Seventh Avenue Line
Coney Island Complex (Brooklyn) (BMT/IND); trains from the IND Culver Line, BMT Sea Beach Line and BMT West End Line
Concourse Yard (Bronx) (IND/IRT); trains from the IND Concourse Line and IRT Jerome Avenue Line
Linden Yard (Brooklyn) (BMT/IRT/LIRR); trains from the BMT Canarsie Line and IRT New Lots Line

Other

BMT West End Line / South Brooklyn Railway (Brooklyn) (BMT/Mainline RR)

Unused connections in the same division
In some places, there are track connections within the same division that are unused in regular service.

Brooklyn
At Coney Island–Stillwell Avenue, see above.
At Broadway Junction, there is an unused flyover between the BMT Canarsie Line and the BMT Jamaica Line.
At Prospect Park, the tracks of the BMT Franklin Avenue Line become the local tracks of the BMT Brighton Line.
At DeKalb Avenue, there is an unused connection between the BMT Brighton Line and the BMT Broadway Line via the Montague Tunnel.

Manhattan
At West Fourth Street–Washington Square, there is an unused connection between the local tracks of the IND Eighth Avenue Line and those of the IND Sixth Avenue Line.
Between Bowling Green and the South Ferry loops, the IRT Lexington Avenue Line and the IRT Broadway–Seventh Avenue Line have crossovers on the balloon loop tracks.
On the 42nd Street Shuttle, there are track connections to the IRT Broadway–Seventh Avenue Line at the west end and the IRT Lexington Avenue Line at the east end. It is not possible to operate through service on this line (i.e. one cannot go from the Broadway –Seventh Avenue Line to the Lexington Avenue Line using the shuttle tracks and vice versa), though the tracks are used to transport trains to and from Livonia Yard in Brooklyn.
South of Broad Street on the BMT Nassau Street Line, the two-track line widens to four tracks. The two inner tracks are used to store and turn  trains, while the two outer tracks continue to the Montague Street Tunnel and to the BMT Fourth Avenue Line in Brooklyn.

Queens
On the IND Rockaway Line, a single track connects the branches of the wye at Hammels, south of Broad Channel, this was used previously for round-robin shuttle service and emergency  service.

Unused center tracks
Many of the New York City Subway's lines have express tracks, unused in revenue service and generally only used for re-routes.

The Bronx
IRT Jerome Avenue Line: Single center track between 149th Street–Grand Concourse and Woodlawn. Some northbound  trains in the morning and afternoon rush hours operate express from 167th Street until Burnside Avenue, where they short-turn.
IRT White Plains Road Line: Single center track between East 180th Street and Wakefield–241st Street.
IRT Dyre Avenue Line: Combinations of track and right of way between the flyover and Dyre Avenue.
IRT Pelham Line: Single center track between Parkchester and Pelham Bay Park.
IRT Broadway–Seventh Avenue Line: Single center track between Dyckman Street and 242nd Street.

Brooklyn
BMT Sea Beach Line: Two center tracks between 86th Street and Eighth Avenue. This was briefly used by the  service in 1967–1968. In 1999, one of the tracks was rehabilitated and the other was disconnected from the line leaving it unusable. The track is used occasionally for reroutes in either direction and possibly equipment testing. In the past, these tracks have been used to store rolling stock that are about to be scrapped.
BMT West End Line: Single center track between Ninth Avenue and Bay 50th Street. Occasionally used for reroutes in either direction.
BMT Brighton Line: Two center tracks between Brighton Beach and Ocean Parkway. These are used for layups and for terminating/turning  trains but are listed here since they are a continuation of the express tracks from the Brighton line, and exist through Ocean Parkway station.
IND Culver Line: Single center track between Church Avenue and Avenue X.
BMT Jamaica Line: Single center track between Myrtle Avenue and Broadway Junction.

Manhattan
IRT Broadway–Seventh Avenue Line: Single center track between 96th Street and 145th Street.
IRT Lenox Avenue Line: Single center track at 135th Street.

Queens
BMT Astoria Line: Single center track between 39th Avenue and Astoria –Ditmars Boulevard. This track was last used for  trains in the peak direction, and being unpopular with residents, was discontinued on January 15, 2002.
IND Fulton Street Line and IND Rockaway Line: On the Fulton Street Line, a single center track between Rockaway Boulevard and west of 88th Street (the track continues through 80th Street but leads only to the Pitkin Yard), and two center tracks from north of Aqueduct to south of Howard Beach–JFK Airport on the IND Rockaway Line.

Above ground sections

A majority of the New York City Subway is underground, but the following segments are located above ground level.

The Bronx
IRT Broadway–Seventh Avenue Line from south of 231st Street to Van Cortlandt Park–242nd Street
IRT Jerome Avenue Line from 149th Street–Grand Concourse to Woodlawn
IRT White Plains Road Line from Third Avenue–149th Street to Wakefield–241st Street
Entire IRT Dyre Avenue Line, except for Pelham Parkway
IRT Pelham Line from Hunts Point Avenue to Pelham Bay Park

Brooklyn
BMT Jamaica Line from west of Marcy Avenue (on the Williamsburg Bridge) to 75th Street–Elderts Lane
BMT Myrtle Avenue Line from west of Central Avenue to Myrtle–Wyckoff Avenues
Entire IRT New Lots Line
Entire BMT Sea Beach Line
Entire BMT West End Line
BMT Canarsie Line at Wilson Avenue (southbound platform elevated, northbound platform is actually on street level but in tunnel below elevated southbound platform), and from Broadway Junction to Canarsie–Rockaway Parkway 
IND Culver Line from south of Carroll Street to Fourth Avenue/Ninth Street, and south of Church Avenue to Coney Island–Stillwell Avenue
BMT Brighton Line from Prospect Park to Coney Island–Stillwell Avenue
Entire BMT Franklin Avenue Line
Both Manhattan Bridge lines

Manhattan
IRT Broadway–Seventh Avenue Line at 125th Street and from Dyckman Street to north of 225th Street.
IRT Lenox Avenue Line is at street level at Harlem–148th Street.
BMT Jamaica Line on the Williamsburg Bridge
Both Manhattan Bridge lines

Queens
BMT Jamaica Line from 75th Street–Elderts Lane to east of 121st Street
BMT Myrtle Avenue Line from Myrtle–Wyckoff Avenues to Middle Village–Metropolitan Avenue
Entire BMT Astoria Line
IRT Flushing Line from Hunters Point Avenue to west of Flushing–Main Street
IND Fulton Street Line east of Grant Avenue
Entire IND Rockaway Line

Trackage

At minimum, in normal revenue service, all lines have two tracks, with one exception: the BMT Franklin Avenue Line has a single track between Franklin Avenue and Park Place.

Three-tracked portions
The New York City Subway has fewer triple track sections than it has quadruple track sections. These sections are listed below. The third track, when in use, is generally for peak-direction express service or reroutes, with exceptions noted below.

 IRT Broadway–Seventh Avenue Line from south of Van Cortlandt Park–242nd Street to north of Dyckman Street and from north of 145th Street to north of 96th Street
 IRT White Plains Road Line from south of Wakefield–241st Street to east of Third Avenue–149th Street
 IRT Lenox Avenue Line at 135th Street – center track is not usable in revenue service
 IRT Jerome Avenue Line – entire line, except for Woodlawn
 IRT Dyre Avenue Line – entire line
 IRT Pelham Line – entire line
 IRT Flushing Line  – from 33rd Street–Rawson Street to Flushing–Main Street
 IRT New Lots Line at Junius Street – center track is not usable in revenue service
 IND Fulton Street Line  – from west of 80th Street to west of Ozone Park–Lefferts Boulevard; the westernmost portion of this track goes to Pitkin Yard
 BMT West End Line  – from Ninth Avenue to Bay 50th Street
 IND Concourse Line  – from 145th Street to Bedford Park Boulevard
 IND Culver Line  – from south of Church Avenue to Avenue X
 BMT Jamaica Line – from Marcy Avenue to Broadway Junction. Also, at 111th Street, the center track is not usable in revenue service
 BMT Canarsie Line at East 105th Street – easternmost track is not usable in revenue service
 BMT Astoria Line – from east of Queensboro Plaza to south of Astoria–Ditmars Boulevard
 IND Crosstown Line at Bedford–Nostrand Avenues – middle track can be used to turn trains coming from either direction
 BMT Broadway Line at Whitehall Street – middle track used to turn southbound and northbound trains

Additionally, there are several pocket tracks in the subway where the line temporarily widens from two to three tracks, such as east of Eighth Avenue on the BMT Canarsie Line, and south of Court Square on the IND Crosstown Line.

Four-tracked portions
Quadruple-tracked portions of track are fairly common in the subway system. This makes it unique among most metro systems in the world, as most others only have two tracks per line. Generally, these portions are a pair of express and a pair of local tracks unless otherwise noted.

Trunk lines:
 IND Sixth Avenue Line between Broadway– Lafayette Street and 47th–50th Streets
 IND Eighth Avenue Line between Chambers Street–World Trade Center and 168th Street, and again at Dyckman Street (two local tracks and two tracks leading to the 207th Street Yard)
 IRT Lexington Avenue Line between Brooklyn Bridge–City Hall and 125th Street
 IRT Broadway–Seventh Avenue Line between Chambers and 96th Streets
 BMT Broadway Line between Canal Street and 57th Street–Seventh Avenue
 BMT Nassau Street Line at Chambers Street (originally a four platform station)
Branch lines:
Manhattan branches:
63rd Street Lines at Lexington Avenue (two levels of one-direction tracks, with both levels containing one track each of IND and BMT, with connections between lines on both levels)
Chrystie Street Connection (one pair IND and one pair BMT)
Manhattan Bridge (one pair of tracks on each of the north and south sides of the bridge)
Queens branches:
IND Queens Boulevard Line east of Queens Plaza
IND Rockaway Line north of Jamaica Bay
Archer Avenue Lines from Sutphin Boulevard and east (two levels of paired tracks: all IND on one, all BMT on the other, without connections between lines)
IRT Flushing Line and BMT Astoria Line at Queensboro Plaza (two levels of one-direction tracks, with both levels containing one track each of IRT and BMT, with a non-revenue connection between lines on upper level)
Brooklyn branches:
IRT Eastern Parkway Line (entire line)
IND Culver Line north of Church Avenue
IND Fulton Street Line between Hoyt–Schermerhorn Streets and Euclid Avenue
BMT Brighton Line between Ocean Parkway and Prospect Park
BMT Fourth Avenue Line north of 59th Street
Manhattan Bridge (one pair of tracks on each of the north and south sides of the bridge)
BMT Sea Beach Line (entire line)

The Bronx has no four-tracked lines. Pocket tracks are not included.

Defunct lines 

The following New York City Subway lines are either entirely defunct or have major portions no longer in service. Defunct spur lines with one station, such as the South Ferry loops, are not included in this list, nor are surface transit lines.

Vestiges of former lines
IRT White Plains Road Line: Just north of the Third Avenue–149th Street station, exiting the tunnel portal, one can see the initial framework of the IRT Third Avenue Line. There used to be a connection from the White Plains Road line to the Third Avenue El, which ran south across the Harlem River to Manhattan.
IRT White Plains Road Line: The other end of the Third Avenue El connected to the White Plains Road line at the lower level of the Gun Hill Road station (closed 1973). Also on the White Plains Road line is the remnant of the short section of track to the original Bronx Park terminal.
IRT Jerome Avenue Line: North of the 161st Street–Yankee Stadium station is the framework for the connection from the IRT Ninth Avenue Line.
IRT Dyre Avenue Line: The Dyre Avenue Line was part of the New York, Westchester, and Boston Railway; it continued north beyond Eastchester–Dyre Avenue to White Plains and Port Chester; and south of the present connection to the White Plains Road line at East 180th Street, to 133rd Street where it ran alongside the New Haven Railroad. The platforms of the NYW&B station are still visible at East 180th Street station and are sometimes used to store trains. The structure south of East 180th Street ends abruptly at the Lebanon Street.
IRT Flushing Line: Part of the trackway from the Queensboro Bridge and the IRT Second Avenue Line is still visible at the east end of Queensboro Plaza.
BMT Nassau Street Line/BMT Broadway Line: The BMT Nassau Street Line used to connect to the south side of the Manhattan Bridge north of Chambers Street. The trackways were disconnected from the Manhattan Bridge after the Chrystie Street Connection opened. Also, heading northbound over the Manhattan Bridge north side, an abandoned tunnel is visible before entering Grand Street. Heading northbound on the south side, the remains of the tunnel to the BMT Nassau Street Line loop is briefly visible. This area was reconfigured as part of the Chrystie Street Connection.
BMT Fulton Street Line: Trackways are still visible at BMT Canarsie Line stations at Broadway Junction and Atlantic Avenue. Framework for the el was up until early 1998, visible at the Franklin Avenue Shuttle station at Franklin Avenue–Fulton Street. The structure served as a pedestrian walkway and was demolished in 1998 when the station and the Franklin Avenue Line was rebuilt as a single-tracked line.
BMT Fulton Street Line: On the IND Fulton Street Line heading westbound from 80th Street, one can see the stub end of the old BMT Fulton Street Line continuing straight ahead while the IND Fulton Street Line curves into Grant Avenue, an underground station.
BMT Culver Line (now IND Culver Line): At Ninth Avenue and at Ditmas Avenue, the original Culver line connected. The trackway is visible at Ditmas Avenue and the ramps are visible at Ninth Avenue.
BMT Jamaica Line: West of Gates Avenue, one can see where the structure turned onto Lexington Avenue to head toward the Brooklyn Bridge. The structure is only visible from street level.
BMT Jamaica Line: West of Marcy Avenue, the BMT Jamaica Line veers right onto the Williamsburg Bridge while the original structure continues straight ahead.
BMT Jamaica Line: East of 121st Street, the 144th Street BMT powerhouse and 168th Street station house still exist along Jamaica Avenue.
The LIRR's Rockaway Beach Branch runs from the White Pot Junction to just east of Rockaway Boulevard, where the IND Rockaway Line begins.

See also 

List of New York City Subway services
New York City Subway nomenclature
Staten Island Railway

Notes 

  The route of the original IRT line, the first underground New York City rapid transit line, began at City Hall in the south, followed the IRT Lexington Avenue Line to 33rd Street, turned west on 42nd Street to Grand Central, followed the IRT 42nd Street Shuttle to Times Square, turned north on Broadway to 50th Street, followed the IRT Broadway–Seventh Avenue Line and terminated at 145th Street.
  The IRT Dyre Avenue Line was formed from the purchase of abandoned New York, Westchester and Boston Railway trackage in 1941.
  The formation of the IND Culver Line occurred when the IND "recaptured" (e.g. New York City took over lines it had built for private companies) the trackage rights of the BMT Culver Line in 1954, connecting Ditmas Avenue to Church Avenue, the terminus of the IND Brooklyn Line.
  For the extension of the IND Fulton Street Line in 1956, the IND "recaptured" the trackage rights of the BMT Fulton Street Line, connecting Hudson Street–80th Street to Grant Avenue.
  The IND Rockaway Line was formed from the purchase of some trackage from the Long Island Rail Road's Rockaway Park Branch and Far Rockaway Branch in 1955.
  At Wilson Avenue, the southbound track is above ground while the northbound one is at-grade. However, the land directly adjacent to the subway station makes the lower level northbound track look as though it is underground, and the upper level southbound track look at-grade.

References 

 

Subway lines

fi:Luettelo New Yorkin metron linjoista